Graves de communi re was an encyclical written by Pope Leo XIII in 1901, on Christian Democracy.  It is part of a larger body of writings known as Catholic social teaching, that trace their origin to Rerum novarum which was issued by Pope Leo XIII in 1891. While reaffirming the Church's opposition to individualistic liberal capitalism, it also denied that the new ideals of Christian Democracy were an endorsement of the principles of a democratic political system. Leo also attacks socialism within the work, referring to it as a "harvest of misery" ''.

See also
 List of encyclicals of Pope Leo XIII

References

External links
 Graves de Communi Re at vatican website
Graves de Communi Re at EWTN website

1901 in Christianity
1901 documents
Encyclicals of Pope Leo XIII
January 1901 events
Christian democracy